"Sympathy" is a song by the English progressive rock band Rare Bird. It became the band's only UK chart entry when it peaked at number 27 in the UK Singles Chart in 1970. The song reached No. 1 in Italy and in France, selling 500,000 copies in France and over one million globally. The song peaked at number 98 in Australia, becoming the group's only top 100 appearance there.

The cover art features a painting by Marc Harrison titled The Birdwoman Of Zartacla (also used for the cover of the June 1981 issue of the Heavy Metal magazine).

Cover versions
 A 1970 cover version of the track by The Family Dogg reached number one in the Netherlands.
 In 1985 Toyah covered the song
 In 1992 a version by Marillion reached number 17 in the UK, becoming their 17th Top 40 hit. 
 In 2002 Faithless sampled the song.

References

1970 singles
1970 songs
1992 singles
Charisma Records singles
EMI Records singles
Marillion songs
Philips Records singles